The Brest Maritime Works Directorate (direction des travaux maritimes de Brest, now Direction régionale du service d'infrastructure de la Défense de Brest) was the name of one of the decentralised directorates within France's SID (Service d'infrastructure de la défense). It is based at Brest and it oversees the expansion and maintenance of the French Navy's military infrastructure in Brest's military port and its annexes, in the operational base on Île Longue, the Lorient military port and the signal-stations chain along the west Brittany coast.

Heads

Fortifications engineers
1682-1691 : Siméon Garangeau
1691-1713 : Mollart
1713-1728 : Isaac Robelin
1728-1739 : Angères du Mains
1739-1743 : Amédée François Frézier

Port engineers
1743-1746 : Blaise Ollivier
1746-1782 : Antoine Choquet de Lindu
1782-1793 : Étienne Nicolas Blondeau
1793-1797 : Camus
1797-1800 : Martret
1800-1802 : Delorme
1802-1808 : Jean Bernard Tarbé de Vauxclairs

Directors of maritime works

1808-1819 : Jean-Nicolas Trouille
1818-1829 : Antoine Elie Lamblardie
1829-1845 : Pierre Trotté de la Roche
1845-1847 : Lemoigne
1847-1849 : Menu du Mesnil

Directors of hydraulic works
1849-1856 : Méry
1857-1876 : Dehargne
1876-1880 : Verrier
1881-1894 : Jenner
1895-1910 : De Miniac
1910-1913 : Bézault
1914-1923 : Mallat

Directors of maritime works
1924-1940 : Thévenot
1940-1945 : Estrade
1945-1950 : Cayotte
1950-1951 : Hamoniaux
1951-1957 : Olliéro
1957-1960 : Boué
1961-1963 : Heuze
1964-1966 : Gendrot
1966-1978 : Bertrand
1978-1981 : Raunet
1981-1987 : Pierre Romenteau
1987-2001 : Philippe Pascal
2001-... : Alain Ollivier

Brest, France
French Navy
Military articles needing translation from French Wikipedia